Lucknow is the capital and the largest city of the Indian state of Uttar Pradesh and it is also the second largest urban agglomeration in Uttar Pradesh. Lucknow is the administrative headquarters of the eponymous district and division. Having a population of 2.8 million as per 2011 census, it is the eleventh most populous city and the twelfth-most populous urban agglomeration of India. Lucknow has always been a multicultural city that flourished as a North Indian cultural and artistic hub, and the seat of power of Nawabs in the 18th and 19th centuries. It continues to be an important centre of governance, administration, education, commerce, aerospace, finance, pharmaceuticals, technology, design, culture, tourism, music and poetry.

Bounded on the east by Barabanki, on the west by Unnao, on the south by Raebareli and in the north by Sitapur and Hardoi, Lucknow sits on the northwestern shore of the Gomti River. , there were 110 wards in the city. Morphologically, three clear demarcations exist:  The Central business district, which is a fully built up area, comprises Hazratganj, Aminabad and Chowk. A middle zone surrounds the inner zone with cement houses while the outer zone consists of slums.

Historically, Lucknow was the capital of the Awadh region, controlled by the Delhi Sultanate and later the Mughal Empire. It was transferred to the Nawabs of Awadh. In 1856, the British East India Company abolished local rule and took complete control of the city along with the rest of Awadh and, in 1857, transferred it to the British Raj. Along with the rest of India, Lucknow became independent from Britain on 15 August 1947. It has been listed as the 17th-fastest growing city in India and 74th in the world.

Lucknow, along with Agra and Varanasi, is in the Uttar Pradesh Heritage Arc, a chain of survey triangulations created by the Government of Uttar Pradesh to boost tourism in the state.

Etymology 
"Lucknow" is the anglicised spelling of the local pronunciation "Lakhnau". According to one legend, the city is named after Lakshmana, a hero of the Hindu epic Ramayana. The legend states that Lakshmana had a palace or an estate in the area, which was called  Lakshmanapuri (Sanskrit: लक्ष्मणपुरी, lit. Lakshmana's city). The settlement came to be known as Lakhanpur (or Lachhmanpur) by the 11th century, and later, Lucknow.

A similar theory states that the city was known as Lakshmanavati (fortunate) after Lakshmana. The name changed to Lakhanavati, then Lakhnauti and finally Lakhnau. Yet another theory states that the city's name is connected with Lakshmi, the Hindu goddess of wealth. Over time, the name changed to Laksmanauti, Laksmnaut, Lakhsnaut, Lakhsnau and, finally, Lakhnau.

History

From 1350 onwards, Lucknow and parts of the Awadh region were ruled by the Delhi Sultanate, Sharqi Sultanate, Mughal Empire, Nawabs of Awadh, the British East India Company and the British Raj.

For about eighty-four years (from 1394 to 1478), Awadh was part of the Sharqi Sultanate of Jaunpur. Emperor Humayun made it a part of the Mughal Empire around 1555. Emperor Jahangir (1569–1627) granted an estate in Awadh to a favoured nobleman, Sheikh Abdul Rahim, who later built Machchi Bhawan on this estate. It later became the seat of power from where his descendants, the Sheikhzadas, controlled the region.

The Nawabs of Lucknow, in reality, the Nawabs of Awadh, acquired the name after the reign of the third Nawab when Lucknow became their capital. The city became North India's cultural capital, and its nawabs, best remembered for their refined and extravagant lifestyles, were patrons of the arts. Under their dominion, music and dance flourished, and construction of numerous monuments took place. Of the monuments standing today, the Bara Imambara, the Chota Imambara, and the Rumi Darwaza are notable examples. One of the Nawab's enduring legacies is the region's syncretic Hindu–Muslim culture that has come to be known as the Ganga-Jamuni Tehzeeb.

Until 1719, the subah of Awadh was a province of the Mughal Empire administered by a governor appointed by the emperor. Persian adventurer Saadat Khan, also known as Burhan-ul-Mulk, was appointed Nizam of Awadh in 1722 and established his court in Faizabad, near Lucknow.

Many independent kingdoms, such as Awadh, were established as the Mughal Empire disintegrated. The third Nawab, Shuja-ud-Daula (r. 1753–1775), fell out with the British after aiding the fugitive Nawab of Bengal, Mir Qasim. Roundly defeated at the Battle of Buxar by the East India Company, he was forced to pay heavy penalties and surrender parts of his territory. Awadh's capital, Lucknow rose to prominence when Asaf-ud-Daula, the fourth Nawab, shifted his court to the city from Faizabad in 1775. The British East India Company appointed a resident (ambassador) in 1773 and by early 19th century gained control of more territory and authority in the state. They were, however, disinclined to capture Awadh outright and come face to face with the Maratha Empire and the remnants of the Mughal Empire. In 1798, the fifth Nawab Wazir Ali Khan alienated both his people and the British and was forced to abdicate. The British then helped Saadat Ali Khan take the throne. He became a puppet king, and in a treaty of 1801, yielded large part of Awadh to the East India Company while also agreeing to disband his own troops in favour of a hugely expensive, British-controlled army. This treaty effectively made the state of Awadh a vassal of the East India Company, although it continued to be part of the Mughal Empire in name until 1819. The treaty of 1801 proved a beneficial arrangement for the East India Company as they gained access to Awadh's vast treasuries, repeatedly digging into them for loans at reduced rates. In addition, the revenues from running Awadh's armed forces brought them useful returns while the territory acted as a buffer state. The Nawabs were ceremonial kings, busy with pomp and show. By the mid-nineteenth century, however, the British had grown impatient with the arrangement and demanded direct control over Awadh.

In 1856 the East India Company first moved its troops to the border, then annexed the state for alleged maladministration. Awadh was placed under a chief commissioner – Sir Henry Lawrence. Wajid Ali Shah, the then Nawab, was imprisoned, then exiled by the East India Company to Calcutta. In the subsequent Indian Rebellion of 1857, his 14-year-old son Birjis Qadra, whose mother was Begum Hazrat Mahal, was crowned ruler. Following the rebellion's defeat, Begum Hazrat Mahal and other rebel leaders sought asylum in Nepal.

Lucknow was one of the major centres of the Indian Rebellion of 1857 and actively participated in India's independence movement, emerging as a strategically important North Indian city. During the Rebellion (also known as the First War of Indian Independence and the Indian Mutiny), the majority of the East India Company's troops were recruited from both the people and nobility of Awadh. The rebels seized control of the state, and it took the British 18 months to reconquer the region. During that period, the garrison based at the Residency in Lucknow was besieged by rebel forces during the Siege of Lucknow. The siege was relieved first by forces under the command of Sir Henry Havelock and Sir James Outram, followed by a stronger force under Sir Colin Campbell. Today, the ruins of the Residency and the Shaheed Smarak offer an insight into Lucknow's role in the events of 1857.

With the rebellion over, Oudh returned to British governance under a chief commissioner. In 1877 the offices of lieutenant-governor of the North-Western Provinces and chief commissioner of Oudh were combined; then in 1902, the title of chief commissioner was dropped with the formation of the United Provinces of Agra and Oudh, although Oudh still retained some marks of its former independence.

The Khilafat Movement had an active base of support in Lucknow, creating united opposition to British rule. In 1901, after remaining the capital of Oudh since 1775, Lucknow, with a population of 264,049, was merged into the newly formed United Provinces of Agra and Oudh. In 1920 the provincial seat of government moved from Allahabad to Lucknow. Upon Indian independence in 1947, the United Provinces were reorganised into the state of Uttar Pradesh, and Lucknow remained its capital.

Lucknow witnessed some of the pivotal moments in the history of India. One is the first meeting of the stalwarts Mahatma Gandhi, Jawaharlal Nehru and Mohd Ali Jinnah during the Indian National Congress session of 1916 (the Lucknow pact was signed and moderates and extremists came together through the efforts of Annie Besant during this session only).
The Congress President for that session, Ambica Charan Majumdar in his address said that "If the Congress was buried at Surat, it is reborn in Lucknow in the garden of Wajid Ali Shah".

The Kakori conspiracy involving Ram Prasad Bismil, Ashfaq Ullah Khan, Rajendra Nath Lahiri, Roshan Singh and others followed by the Kakori trial which captured the imagination of the country also took place in Lucknow.

Culturally, Lucknow has also had a tradition of courtesans, with popular culture distilling it in the avatar of the fictional Umrao Jaan.

Geography

The Gomti River, Lucknow's chief geographical feature, meanders through the city and divides it into the Trans-Gomti and Cis-Gomti regions. Situated in the middle of the Indus-Gangetic Plain, the city is surrounded by rural towns and villages: the orchard town of Malihabad, Kakori, Mohanlalganj, Gosainganj, Chinhat and Itaunja. To the east lies Barabanki, to the west Unnao, to the south Raebareli, while to the north lie the Sitapur and Hardoi. Lucknow city is located in a seismic zone III.

Climate
Lucknow has a humid subtropical climate (Köppen Cwa) with cool, dry winters from mid-November to February and dry, hot summers with sunshine from March to mid-May. Fog is quite common from mid-December to late January. Occasionally, Lucknow experiences colder winter spells than places like Shimla and Mussoorie which are situated way high up in the Himalayas. In the extraordinary winter cold spell of 2012–2013, Lucknow recorded temperatures below freezing point on two consecutive days and the minimum temperature hovered around freezing point for over a week. Summers are very hot with temperatures rising into the  range, the average maxima being in the high 30s Celsius.

Flora and fauna
Lucknow has a total of 5.66 percent of forest cover. The state average is around 7 percent. Shisham, Dhak, Mahuamm, Babul, Neem, Peepal, Ashok, Khajur, Mango and Gular trees are all grown here.

Several varieties of mangoes, especially Dasheri, are grown in the Malihabad adjacent to the city and a block of the Lucknow district for export. The main crops are wheat, paddy, sugarcane, mustard, potatoes, and vegetables such as cauliflower, cabbage, tomato and brinjals. Similarly, sunflowers, roses, and marigolds are cultivated over a fairly extensive area. Many medicinal and herbal plants are also grown here while common Indian monkeys are found in patches in and around city forests such as Musa Bagh.

The Lucknow Zoo, one of the oldest in the country, was established in 1921. It houses a rich collection of animals from Asia, and other continents. The zoo also has enjoyable toy train rides for the visitors. The city also has a botanical garden, which is a zone of wide botanical diversity. It also houses the Uttar Pradesh State Museum. It has sculptural masterpieces dating back to the 3rd century AD, including intricately carved Mathura sculptures ranging from dancing girls to scenes from the life of Buddha.

Economy

The major industries in the Lucknow urban agglomeration include aeronautics, automotive, machine tools, distillery chemicals, furniture and Chikan embroidery. Lucknow is among the top cities of India by GDP. It is a centre for research and development as home to the R&D centres of the National Milk Grid of the National Dairy Development Board, the Central Institute of Medical and Aromatic Plants, the National Handloom Development Corporation and U.P. Export Corporation. Lucknow is ranked sixth in a list of the ten fastest growing job-creating cities in India according to a study conducted by Assocham Placement Pattern, Lucknow's economy was formerly based on the tertiary sector and the majority of the workforce were employed as government servants. Large-scale industrial establishments are few compared to other northern Indian state capitals like New Delhi. The economy is growing with contributions from the fields of IT, manufacturing and processing and medical/biotechnology. Business-promoting institutions such as the CII have set up their service centres in the city. Major export items are marbled products, handicrafts, art pieces, gems, jewellery, textiles, electronics, software products, computers, hardware products, apparel, brass products, silk, leather goods, glass items and chemicals. Lucknow has promoted public-private partnerships in sectors such as electricity supply, roads, expressways, and educational ventures.

Multiple software and IT companies are present in the city. Tata Consultancy Services, HCL Technologies are present in the city. IT companies are located in Gomtinagar. There are many local open source technology companies. The city is also home to a number of important national and state level headquarters for companies including Sony Corporation and Reliance Retail. The handicrafts sector  accounts for 60 percent of total exports from the state.

Companies such as Hindustan Aeronautics Limited, KARAM, Tata Marcopolo,  Exide Industries, Tata Motors set up their plants in Lucknow. Lucknow is an emerging automobile hub. Tata Motors have a plant primarily for light commercial vehicles. It was set up in 1992 and has a production capacity of 640 vehicles per day. Additionally there is a plant of Tata Marcopolo in the city.

To promote the textile industry in the city, the Indian government has allocated Rs. 2 billion (2000 million rupees) to set up a textile business cluster in the city.  A sprawling  IT city costing 15 billion Rupees is planned by the state government at the Chak Ganjaria farms site on the road to Sultanpur and they have already approved special economic zone status for the project, which is expected to create thousands of job opportunities in the state. A defense industrial corridor is also coming in the city.

Administration

Administration

General administration 
Lucknow division which consists of six districts, and is headed by the Divisional Commissioner of Lucknow, who is an IAS officer of high seniority, the Commissioner is the head of local government institutions (including municipal corporations) in the division, is in charge of infrastructure development in his division, and is also responsible for maintaining law and order in the division. The District Magistrate of Lucknow reports to the divisional commissioner. The current commissioner is Mukesh Meshram.

Lucknow district administration is headed by the District Magistrate of Lucknow, who is an IAS officer. The DM is in charge of property records and revenue collection for the central government and oversees the elections held in the city. The district has five tehsils, viz. Sadar, Mohanlalganj, Bakshi ka Talab, Malihabad and Sarojini Nagar, each headed by a Sub-Divisional Magistrate. The current DM is Abhishek Prakash. The district magistrate is assisted by a Chief Development Officer (CDO), eight Additional District Magistrates (ADM) (Finance/Revenue, East, West Trans-Gomti, Executive, Land Acquisition-I, Land Acquisition-II, Civil Supply), one City Magistrate (CM) and seven Additional City Magistrates (ACM).

Civic administration 
The Lucknow Municipal Corporation oversees civic activities in the city. The city's first municipal body dates from 1862 when the municipal board was established. The first Indian mayor, Syed Nabiullah, was elected in 1917 after the enforcement of the UP Municipalities Act, 1916. In 1948, the Uttar Pradesh government changed the system from an electoral one to an administrator-run one and Bhairav Datt Sanwal became the administrator. In 1959, the UP Municipalities Act, 1916 was replaced with Uttar Pradesh Municipal Corporation Act, 1959 and Lucknow Municipal Corporation was established in 1960 with Raj Kumar Shrivastava becoming the mayor.

The head of the corporation is the mayor, but the executive and administration of the corporation are the responsibility of the municipal commissioner, who is an Uttar Pradesh government-appointed Indian Administrative Services (IAS) officer of high seniority. The last municipal election took place in 2017 when Sanyukta Bhatia from Bharatiya Janata Party became the first female mayor of Lucknow. Bharatiya Janata Party won 57 councillor seats, Samajwadi Party won 31 seats, independent candidates won 14 seats, and Indian National Congress won 8 seats. Ajay Kumar Dwivedi, an IAS officer, is the present municipal commissioner since 17 August 2020. The Uttar Pradesh Municipal Corporation Act, 1959 gives provisions for the establishment of ward committees, but they have not been formed yet.

The sources for revenue generation for Lucknow Municipal Corporation include property tax, user charges for SWM, penalties, rent from municipal properties, income from water storage, water transmission, drainage and sanitation, grants, and charges for services such as birth and death certificates. The municipal corporation has the following administrative departments: Health Department, House Tax Department, Engineering Department, Park Department, Advertisement Department, Accounting Department, Property Department. There is also an executive committee (कार्यकारिणी समिति) made up of 12 elected councillors from different political parties, who decide on policy matters of the corporation.

Police administration 
 
The Police Commissionerate System was introduced in Lucknow on 14 January 2020. The district police is headed by a Commissioner of Police (CP), who is an IPS officer of ADGP rank and is assisted by two Joint Commissioners of Police (IG rank), and five Deputy Commissioners of Police (SP rank). Lucknow is divided into five zones, each headed by a Deputy Commissioner of Police. Of the two Joint Commissioners, one looks after law and order, the other crime. The current police commissioner of Lucknow City is IPS SB Shirodkar.

The district police observes the citizenry through high-technology control rooms and all important streets and intersections are under surveillance with the help of CCTVs and drone cameras. Crowd-control is carried out with the help of pepper-spraying drones.
There are more than 10,000 CCTV cameras deployed by the Lucknow Police Department across the city roads and trijunctions, making Lucknow the first city in the country to do so.

The Lucknow Modern Police Control Room (abbreviated as MCR) is India's biggest 'Dial 112' service centre with 300 communication officers to receive distress calls from all over the state and 200 dispatch officers to rush for police help. It is billed as the India's most hi-tech police control room. Lucknow is also the center for 1090 Women Power line, a call center based service directed at dealing with eve-teasing. An Integrated 'Dial 112' Control Room building is also there which is having the world's biggest modern Police Emergency Response System (PERS).

The Lucknow Fire Brigade department is headed by the chief fire officer, who is subordinate to the district magistrate and is assisted by a deputy chief fire officer and divisional officers.

Judicial institutions 

There is a bench of the Allahabad High Court in Lucknow. Aside from this, Lucknow has a District & Sessions Court, five CBI Courts, one family court and two railway courts. The High Court Bench as well as the District & Sessions Court and the CBI courts are located in Qaiser Bagh, and the railway courts are in Charbagh.

Central government offices 

Since 1 May 1963, Lucknow has been the headquarters of the Central Command of the Indian Army, before which it was the headquarters of Eastern Command.

Lucknow also houses a branch office of National Investigation Agency which is responsible for combating terrorist activities in India. It oversees five states of Bihar, Madhya Pradesh, Uttarakhand, Jharkhand and Chhattisgarh for Naxal and terrorist activities.

The Commission of Railway Safety of India, under the Ministry of Civil Aviation, has its head office in the Northeast Railway Compound in Lucknow.

Infrastructure 
The development of infrastructure in the city is overseen by Lucknow Development Authority (LDA), which comes under the Housing Department of Uttar Pradesh government. The Divisional Commissioner of Lucknow acts as the ex-officio chairman of LDA, whereas a vice-chairman, a government-appointed IAS officer, looks after the daily matters of the authority. The current vice-chairman of the Lucknow Development Authority is IAS Akshay Tripathi. LDA prepared the Lucknow master plan 2031.

Politics 
As the seat of the government of Uttar Pradesh, Lucknow is the site of the Uttar Pradesh Vidhan Sabha, a bench of the Allahabad High Court and numerous government departments and agencies. Rajnath Singh, the Union Defense Minister, from Bharatiya Janata Party is the Member of Parliament from Lucknow Lok Sabha Constituency. Kaushal Kishore is the Member of Parliament from Mohanlalganj (Lok Sabha constituency), the second Lok Sabha constituency in Lucknow.  Apart from the Lok Sabha Constituency, there are nine Vidhan Sabha Constituencies within Lucknow city:

Public utilities 
Madhyanchal Power Distribution Corporation Limited, also known as Madhyanchal Vidyut Vitaran Nigam is responsible for supplying electricity in Lucknow. It is under the Uttar Pradesh Power Corporation Ltd. Fire safety services are provided by the Uttar Pradesh Fire Service, which is under the state government. Jal Nigam is responsible for developing and maintaining the infrastructure for water supply, sewer lines, and storm water drains. Jal Sansthan is responsible for supplying water and providing water and sewer connections. Lucknow Municipal Corporation is responsible for the solid waste management of Lucknow.

Transport

Roads

Two major Indian National Highways have their intersection at Lucknow's Hazratganj intersection: NH-30 to Shahjahanpur Via Sitapur in north and NH-30 to south Allahabad via Raebareli, NH-27 to Kanpur and Porbandar via Jhansi and Silchar via Gorakhpur. Multiple modes of public transport are available such as metro rail, taxis, city buses, cycle rickshaws, auto rickshaws and compressed natural gas (CNG) low-floor buses with and without air-conditioning. CNG was introduced as an auto fuel to keep air pollution under control. Radio Taxis are operated by several major companies like Ola and Uber.

Bus

City buses

 
Lucknow city's bus service is operated by Lucknow City Transport Services Limited (LCTSL), a public sector passenger road transport corporation headquartered in Triloki Nath Margh. It has 260 buses operating in the city. There are around 35 routes in the city. Terminals for city buses are located in Gudamba, Viraj Khand, Alambagh, Scooter India, Institute of Engineering and Technology, Babu Banarasi Das University, Safedabad, Pasi qila, Charbagh, Andhe Ki Chowki, Jankipuram, Gomti Nagar Railway Station, Budheshwar Intersection, Faizabad Road and Qaiserbagh. There are four bus depots in Gomti Nagar, Charbagh, Amausi, and Dubagga.

Inter-state buses

 
 
 
The major Dr. Bhimrao Ambedkar Inter-state Bus Terminal (ISBT) in Alambagh provides the main inter and intrastate bus lines in Lucknow. Located on National Highway 25, it provides adequate services to ongoing and incoming customers. There is a smaller bus station at Qaiserbagh. The bus terminal formally operated at Charbagh, in front of the main railway station, has now been re-established as a city bus depot. This decision was taken by the state government and UPSRTC to decongest traffic in the railway station area. Kanpur Lucknow Roadways Service is a key service for daily commuters who travel back and forth to the city for business and educational purposes. Air conditioned "Royal Cruiser" buses manufactured by Volvo are operated by UPSRTC for inter state bus services. Main cities served by the UPSRTC intrastate bus service are Allahabad, Varanasi, Jaipur, Jhansi, Agra, Delhi, Gorakhpur. The cities outside Uttar Pradesh that are covered by inter-state bus services are Jaipur, New Delhi, Kota, Singrauli, Faridabad, Gurgaon, Dausa, Ajmer, Dehradun, and Haridwar.

Railways

 

Lucknow is served by several railway stations in different parts of the city. The main long-distance railway station is Lucknow Railway Station located at Charbagh. It has an imposing structure built in 1923 and acts as the divisional headquarters of the Northern Railway division. Its neighbouring and second major long-distance railway station is Lucknow Junction railway station operated by the North Eastern Railway. The city is an important junction with links to all major cities of the state and country such as New Delhi, Mumbai, Hyderabad, Kolkata, Chandigarh, Nashik, Amritsar, Jammu, Chennai, Bangalore, Ahmedabad, Pune, Indore, Bhopal, Jhansi, Jabalpur, Jaipur, Raipur and Siwan. The city has a total of fourteen railway stations. Earlier the meter-gauge services originated at Aishbagh and connected to Lucknow city, Daliganj and Mohibullapur. Now all the stations have been converted to broad gauge. All stations lie within the city limits and are well interconnected by bus services and other public road transport. Suburban stations include Bakshi Ka Talab and Kakori. The Lucknow–Kanpur Suburban Railway was started in 1867 to cater for the needs of commuters travelling between Lucknow and Kanpur. Trains running on this service also stop at numerous stations at different locations in the city forming a suburban rail network.

Air transport

Direct air connections are available in Lucknow to New Delhi, Patna, Kolkata, Mumbai, Bangalore, Ahmedabad, Hyderabad, Chennai, Guwahati, Jaipur, Raipur and other major cities via Chaudhary Charan Singh International Airport. The airport has been ranked the second-best in the world in the small airport category. The airport is suitable for all-weather operations and provides parking facilities for up to 14 aircraft. At present Air India, Air India Express, GoAir, IndiGo, Saudi Airlines, Flydubai, Oman Air and Vistara operate domestic and international flights to and from Lucknow. Covering , with Terminal 1 for international flights and Terminal 2 for domestic flights, the airport can handle Boeing 767 to Boeing 747-400 aircraft allowing significant passenger and cargo traffic. International destinations include
Dubai, Muscat, Sharjah, Riyadh, Bangkok, Dammam and Jeddah.

The planned expansion of the airport will allow Airbus A380 jumbo jets to land at the airport. The Nagarjuna construction company (NCC) has started the construction of the new terminal at Lucknow Airport which is expected to be completed by December 2021 to meet the growing demand. There is also a plan for runway expansion. It is the tenth busiest airport in India, the busiest in Uttar Pradesh, and the second-busiest in northern India.

In February 2019, the airport was privatised and leased to Adani Group for 50 years at the highest bid of 171 per passenger.

Metro

Lucknow Metro is a rapid transit system which started its operations from 6 September 2017. Lucknow Metro system is the most-quickly built metro system in the world and most economical high-speed rapid transit system project in India. The commencement of civil works started on 27 September 2014.

In February, Chief Minister Akhilesh Yadav approved to set up of a metro rail system for the state capital. It is divided into two corridors the North-south corridor connecting Munshipulia to CCS International Airport and the East-west corridor connecting Charbagh Railway Station to Vasant Kunj. This will be the most expensive public transport system in the state but will provide a rapid means of mass transport to decongest traffic on city roads. Construction of the first phase will be complete by March 2017. The completion of metro rail project is the primary object of Uttar Pradesh government currently headed by the chief minister Yogi Adityanath

On 5 September 2017, Home Minister Rajnath Singh and CM Yogi Adityanath showed green flag to the Lucknow Metro.

Cycling 
Lucknow is among the most bicycle-friendly cities in Uttar Pradesh. Bike-friendly tracks have been established near the chief minister's residence in the city. The  track encompasses La-Martiniere College Road next to a golf club on Kalidas Marg, where the chief minister resides, and Vikramaditya Marg, which houses the office of the ruling party. The dedicated  lane for cyclists is separate from the footpath and the main road. With Amsterdam as the inspiration, new cycle tracks are to be constructed in the city to make it more cycle-friendly, with facilities like bike rental also in the works. In the year 2015, Lucknow also hosted a national level cycling event called 'The Lucknow Cyclothon' in which professional and amateur cyclists took part. An under-construction cycle track network by the government of Uttar Pradesh is set to make Lucknow the city with India's biggest cycle network.

Demographics

The population of Lucknow Urban Agglomeration (LUA) rose above one million in 1981, while the 2001 census estimated it had risen to 2.24 million. This included about 60,000 people in the Lucknow Cantonment and 2.18 million in Lucknow city and represented an increase of 34.53% over the 1991 figure.

According to the provisional report of 2011 Census of India, Lucknow city had a population of 2,815,601, of which 1,470,133 were men and 1,345,468 women. This was an increase of 25.36% compared to the 2001 figures.

Between 1991 and 2001, the population registered growth of 32.03%, significantly lower than the 37.14% which was registered between 1981 and 1991. The Scheduled Caste population of the state represented 21.3% of the total population, a figure higher than the state average of 21.15%.

The sex ratio in Lucknow city stood at 915 females per 1000 males in 2011, compared to the 2001 census figure of 888. The average national sex ratio in India is 940 according to the Census 2011 Directorate. The city has a total literacy level in 2011 of 84.72% compared to 67.68% for Uttar Pradesh as a whole. In 2001 these same figures stood at 75.98% and 56.27%. In Lucknow city, the total literate population totalled 2,147,564 people of which 1,161,250 were male and 986,314 were female. Despite the fact that the overall work-participation rate in the district (32.24%) is higher than the state average (23.7%), the rate among females in Lucknow is very low at only 5.6% and shows a decline from the 1991 figure of 5.9%.

Architecture

Lucknow's buildings show different styles of architecture with the many iconic buildings built during the British and Mughal era. More than half of these buildings lie in the old part of the city. The Uttar Pradesh Tourism Department organises a "Heritage Walk" for tourists covering the popular monuments. Among the extant architecture, there are religious buildings such as Imambaras, mosques, and other Islamic shrines as well as secular structures such as enclosed gardens, baradaris, and palace complexes.

Bara Imambara in Hussainabad is a colossal edifice built in 1784 by the then Nawab of Lucknow, Asaf-ud-Daula. It was originally built to provide assistance to people affected by the deadly famine, which struck the whole of Uttar Pradesh in the same year. It is the largest hall in Asia without any external support from wood, iron or stone beams. The monument required approximately 22,000 labourers during construction.

It is also known as the Turkish Gateway, as it was erroneously thought to be identical to the gateway at Constantinople. The edifice provides the west entrance to the Great Imambara and is embellished with lavish decorations.

Various architectural styles can be seen in the historical areas of Lucknow. The University of Lucknow shows a huge inspiration from the European style while Indo-Saracenic Revival architecture is prominently present in the Uttar Pradesh Vidhan Sabha building and Charbagh Railway station. Dilkusha Kothi is the remains of a palace constructed by the British resident Major Gore Ouseley around 1800 and showcases English Baroque architecture. It served as a hunting lodge for the Nawab of Awadhs and as a summer resort.

The Chattar Manzil, which served as the palace for the rulers of Awadh and their wives is topped by an umbrella-like dome and so named on account of Chattar being the Hindi word for "umbrella".
Opposite Chattar Manzil stands the 'Lal Baradari' built by Nawab Saadat Ali Khan I between 1789 and 1814. It functioned as a throne room at coronations for the royal courts. The building is now used as a museum and contains delicately executed portraits of men who played major roles in the administration of the kingdom of Oudh.

Another example of mixed architectural styles is La Martiniere College, which shows a fusion of Indian and European ideas. It was built by Major-General Claude Martin who was born in Lyon and died in Lucknow on 13 September 1800. Originally named "Constantia", the ceilings of the building are domed with no wooden beams used for construction. Glimpses of Gothic architecture can also be seen in the college building.

Lucknow's Asafi Imambara exhibits vaulted halls as its architectural speciality.
The Bara Imambara, Chhota Imambara and Rumi Darwaza stand in testament to the city's Nawabi mixture of Mughlai and Turkish styles of architecture while La Martiniere college bears witness to the Indo-European style. Even the new buildings are fashioned using characteristic domes and pillars, and at night these illuminated monuments become the city's main attractions.

Around Hazratganj, the city's central shopping area, there is a fusion of old and modern architecture. It has a multi-level parking lot in place of an old and dilapidated police station making way for extending the corridors into pebbled pathways, adorned with piazzas, green areas and wrought-iron and cast-iron lamp-posts, reminiscent of the Victorian era, flank both sides of the street.

Culture

In common with other metropolitan cities across India, Lucknow is multicultural and multilingual. Many of the cultural traits and customs peculiar to Lucknow have become living legends today. The city's contemporary culture is the result of the amalgamation of the Hindu and Muslim rulers who ruled the city simultaneously. The credit for this goes to the secular and syncretic traditions of the Nawabs of Awadh, who took a keen interest in every walk of life and encouraged these traditions to attain a rare degree of sophistication. Modern-day Lucknowites are known for their polite and polished way of speaking which is noticed by visitors. The residents of Lucknow call themselves Lucknowites or Lakhnavi. It also represents the melting pot of globalisation where the legacy of Nawab's culture continues to be reflected in the traditional vocabulary of the Hindi language of the city along with better avenues for modernisation present here.

Traditional Outfit 

Lucknow is known for its ghararas. It is a traditional women's outfit that originated from the Nawabs of Awadh. It is a pair of loose trousers with pleats below the knee worn with a kurta (shirt) and a dupatta (veil). It is embroidered with zari and zardozi along with gota (decorative lace on the knee area).

Language and poetry
Although Uttar Pradesh's primary official language is Hindi, the most commonly spoken language is colloquial Hindustani. Indian English is also well understood and is widely used for business and administrative purposes, as a result of India's British heritage and Commonwealth tradition, as well as globalisation. The Urdu language is also a part of Lucknowi culture and heritage. It is mostly used by wealthier families, the remaining members of the royal family as well as in Urdu poetry and on public signs. The government has taken many innovative steps to promote Urdu. Awadhi, a dialect of the Hindi dialect continuum, is the native dialect of Lucknow and has played an important role in Lucknow's history and is still used in the city's rural areas and by the urban population on the streets.

Historically, Lucknow was considered one of the great centres of Muslim culture. Two poets, Mir Babar Ali Anis and Mirza Dabeer, became legendary exponents of a unique genre of Muslim elegiacal poetry called marsiya centred on Imam Husain's supreme sacrifice in the Battle of Karbala, which is commemorated during the annual observance of Muharram.

The revolutionary Ram Prasad Bismil, who was hanged by the British at Gorakhpur jail, was largely influenced by the culture of Lucknow and remembered its name in his poetry. Surrounding towns such as Kakori, Daryabad, Fatehpur, Barabanki, Rudauli, and Malihabad produced many eminent Urdu poets and litterateurs including Mohsin Kakorvi, Majaz, Khumar Barabankvi and Josh Malihabadi.

Cuisine

The Awadh region has its own distinct Nawabi-style cuisine. Since ages, the Bawarchis (chefs) and Rakabdars (royal chefs) have developed great finesse in cooking and presentation of food, under royal patronage. This gave rise to the art of cooking over a slow fire (or Dum style cooking), which has become synonymous with "Awadhi" cuisine. These Bawarchis added elaborately prepared dishes like kababs, kormas, kaliya, nahari-kulchas, zarda, sheermal, roomali rotis and warqi parathas to the traditional "Awadhi" dastarkhwaan (feast of dishes). The best-known dishes of this area consist of biryanis, kebabs and breads. Kebabs are served in a variety of styles; kakori, galawati, shami, boti, patili-ke, ghutwa and seekh are among the available varieties. Tunde ke kabab restaurants are popular for a type of soft kebab developed by a one-armed chef (hence the name Tunday) for a Nawab who had lost his teeth. The reputation of Lucknow's kebabs is not limited to the local population and the dish attracts people from other cities as well as other countries.

Lucknow is also known for its chaats, street food, kulfi, paan and sweets. Nahari, a dish prepared using mutton, is popular among non-vegetarians. Sheermal is a type of sweet bread (paratha) prepared in Lucknow. Makkhan-malai is another sweet delicacy of Lucknow made and sold only during winters. Some restaurants in the city are around a century old; there are also many high-end restaurants, bakeries, lounges and pubs which cater to the affluent class and foreign travellers.

Festivals
Indian festivals such as Christmas, Diwali, Durga Puja, Eid, Holi, Raksha Bandhan and Vijayadashami are celebrated with great pomp and show in the city. Some of the other festivals or processions are as follows:

 Lucknow Mahotsav
Lucknow Festival is organised every year to showcase Uttar Pradesh art and culture and to promote tourism. With 1975–76 designated South Asian Tourism Year, Lucknow took the opportunity to promote the city's art, culture and tourism to national and international tourists. The first Lucknow Festival was staged as a part of this promotion and ever since, with some exceptions, Lucknow Mahotsava has taken place annually.

 Lucknow Literature Festival

This is an annual literature festival held in the month of November every year since 2013. Lucknow LitFest is India's second-largest literature festival featuring some of the greatest writers and thinkers from across the globe.

 Muharram

Lucknow is known as a seat of Shia Islam and the epitome of Shia culture in India. Muslims observe Muharram, the first month of the Islamic calendar and on Ashura (the tenth day of the month) mourn the memory of Imam Husain, grandson of the Islamic prophet, Muhammad. Muharram processions in Lucknow have a special significance and began during the reign of the Awadh Nawabs.

Processions such as Shahi Zarih, Jaloos-e-Mehndi, Alam-e-Ashura and Chup Tazia had special significance by the Shia community and were affected with great religious zeal and fervour until 1977 the government of Uttar Pradesh banned public Azadari processions. For the following twenty years, processions and gatherings took place in private or community spaces including Talkatora Karbala, Bara Imambara (Imambara Asifi), Chota Imambara (Imambara Husainabad), Dargah Hazrat Abbas, Shah Najaf and Imambara Ghufran Ma'ab. The ban was partially lifted in 1997 and Shias were successful in taking out the first Azadari procession in January 1998 on the 21st of Ramadan, the Muslim fasting month. The Shias are authorised to stage nine processions out of the nine hundred that are listed in the register of the Shias.

 Deva Mela  

Deva Mela is celebrated during the anniversary of Sufi saint Haji Waris Ali Shah at Dewa, India which is 26 K.M from Lucknow city. Sufi songs (Qawwalis) are recited at the Dargah. Devotees also carry sheets/Chadars to the shrines.
 
 Chup Tazia
The procession originated in Lucknow before spreading to other parts of South Asia. Dating back to the era of the Nawabs, it was started by Nawab Ahmed Ali Khan Shaukat Yar Jung a descendant of Bahu Begum. It has become one of the most important Azadari processions in Lucknow and one of the nine permitted by the government. This last mourning procession takes place on the morning of the 8th of Rabi' al-awwal, the third Muslim month and includes alam (flags), Zari and a ta'zieh (an imitation of the mausoleums in Karbala). It originates at the Imambara Nazim Saheb in Victoria Street then moves in complete silence through Patanala until it terminates at the Karbala Kazmain, where the colossal black ta'zieh is buried.

 Bada Mangal festival is celebrated in May as a birthday of the ancient Hanuman temple known as Purana Mandir. During this festival, fairs are conducted by the local public in the whole city. Bhandara is organised by local people almost in all streets across the city and serves free food to all the passersby irrespective of religion. Many of the Muslim Community also set up these Bhandara. It is celebrated in the name of Hindu God Lord Hanuman and reflects the Ganga Jamuni Tehzeeb.

Dance, drama and music

The classical Indian dance form Kathak originated from Lucknow. Wajid Ali Shah, the last Nawab of Awadh, was a great patron and a passionate champion of Kathak. Lachhu Maharaj, Acchchan Maharaj, Shambhu Maharaj and Birju Maharaj have kept this tradition alive.

Lucknow is also the home city of the eminent ghazal singer Begum Akhtar. A pioneer of the style, "Ae Mohabbat Tere anjaam pe rona aaya" is one of her best known musical renditions. Bhatkande Music Institute University at Lucknow is named after the musician Vishnu Narayan Bhatkhande Bhartendu Academy of Dramatic Arts (BNA), also known as Bhartendu Natya Academy, is a theatre-training institute situated at Gomti Nagar. It is a deemed university and an autonomous organisation under the Ministry of Culture, Government of Uttar Pradesh. It was set up in 1975 by the Sangeet Natak Akademy (government of Uttar Pradesh), and became an independent drama school in 1977. Apart from government institutes, there are many private theatre groups including IPTA, Theatre Arts Workshop (TAW), Darpan, Manchkriti and the largest youth theatre group, Josh. This is a group for young people to experience theatre activities, workshops and training.

Lucknow is also the birthplace of musicians including Naushad, Talat Mahmood, Anup Jalota and Baba Sehgal as well as British pop celebrity Sir Cliff Richard.

Lucknow Chikan
Lucknow is known for embroidery works including chikankari, zari, zardozi, kamdani and gota making (gold lace weaving).

Chikankari is an embroidery work well known all over India. This 400-year-old art in its present form was developed in Lucknow and it remains the only location where the skill is practised today. Chikankari constitutes 'shadow work' and is a delicate and artistic hand embroidery done using white thread on fine white cotton cloth such as fine muslin or chiffon. Yellowish muga silk is sometimes used in addition to the white thread. The work is done on caps, kurtas, saris, scarfs, and other vestments. The chikan industry, almost unknown under the Nawabs, has not only survived but has flourished. About 2,500 entrepreneurs have engaged in manufacturing chikan for sale in local, national and international markets with Lucknow the largest exporter of chikan embroidered garments.

As a sign of recognition, in December 2008, the Indian Geographical Indication Registry (GIR) accorded Geographical Indication (GI) status for chikankari, recognising Lucknow as the exclusive hub for its manufacture.

Quality of life 
Lucknow was ranked "India's second happiest city" in a survey conducted by IMRB International and LG Corporation, after only Chandigarh. It fared better than other metropolitan cities in India including New Delhi, Bangalore and Chennai. Lucknow was found to be better than other cities in areas such as food, transit and overall citizen satisfaction.

Education

Lucknow is home to a number of prominent educational and research organisations including Indian Institute of Management Lucknow (IIM-L), Indian Institute of Information Technology, Lucknow (IIIT-L), Central Drug Research Institute (CDRI), Indian Institute of Toxicology Research, National Botanical Research Institute (NBRI), Institute of Engineering and Technology (IET Lko), Dr. Ram Manohar Lohia National Law University (RMNLU), Institute of Hotel Management, Lucknow (IHM), Sanjay Gandhi Postgraduate Institute of Medical Sciences (SGPGI), Dr. Ram Manohar Lohia Institute of Medical Sciences and King George's Medical University (KGMU). The National P. G. College (NPGC), affiliated to the University of Lucknow, was ranked as the second-best college imparting formal education in the country by the National Assessment and Accreditation Council in 2014.

Educational institutions in the city include seven universities including the University of Lucknow, a Babasaheb Bhimrao Ambedkar University, a technical university (Uttar Pradesh Technical University), a law university (RMLNLU), an Islamic university (DUNU) and many polytechnics, engineering institutes and industrial-training institutes. Other research organisations in the state include the Central Institute of Medicinal and Aromatic Plants, Central Food Technological Research Institute, and the Central Glass and Ceramic Research Institute.

Some of Uttar Pradesh's major schools are located in Lucknow including Delhi Public School having its branches in Eldeco, Indiranagar. Lucknow International Public School, City Montessori School, Colvin Taluqdars' College, Centennial Higher Secondary School, St. Francis' College, Loreto Convent Lucknow, St. Mary's Convent Inter College, Kendriya Vidyalaya, Lucknow Public School, Stella Maris Inter College, Seth M.R. Jaipuria School, Cathedral School, Mary Gardiner's Convent School, Modern School, Amity International School, St. Agnes, Army Public School, Mount Carmel College, Study Hall, Christ Church College, Rani Laxmi Bai School and Central Academy.

City Montessori School, with over 20 branches spread throughout the city, is the only school in the world to have been awarded a UNESCO Prize for Peace Education. CMS also holds a Guinness World Record for being the largest school in the world, with over 40,000 pupils. The school consistently ranks among the top schools of India.

La Martiniere Lucknow, founded in 1845, is the only school in the world to have been awarded a battle honour. It is one of the oldest schools in India, often ranked among the top ten schools in the country. Lucknow also has a sports college named Guru Gobind Singh Sports College.

Media
Lucknow has had an influence on the Hindi film industry as the birthplace of poet, dialogue writer and script writer K. P. Saxena, Suresh Chandra Shukla born 10 February 1954 along with veteran Bollywood and Bengali film actor Pahari Sanyal, who came from the city's well known Sanyal family.
Several movies have used Lucknow as their backdrop including Shashi Kapoor's Junoon, Muzaffar Ali's Umrao Jaan and Gaman, Satyajit Ray's Shatranj ke khiladi. Ismail Merchant's Shakespeare Wallah, PAA and Shailendra Pandey's JD. In the movie Gadar: Ek Prem Katha Lucknow was used to depict Pakistan, with locations including Lal Pul, the Taj Hotel and the Rumi Darwaza used in Tanu Weds Manu. Some parts of Ladies vs Ricky Bahl, Bullett Raja, Ishaqzaade, Ya Rab and Dabangg 2 were shot in Lucknow or at other sites nearby. A major section of the Bollywood movie, Daawat-e-Ishq starring Aditya Roy Kapur and Parineeti Chopra was shot in the city as was Baawre, an Indian TV drama, airing on the Life OK channel. The government has announced to develop two film cities in Lucknow. Here are some newspaper companies working and give online news services to the news readers including Amar Ujala, Dainik Jagran, Hindustan Times, The Times of India and Dainik Bhaskar.

The Pioneer newspaper, headquartered in Lucknow and started in 1865, is the second-oldest English-language newspaper in India still in production. The country's first prime minister Jawaharlal Nehru founded The National Herald in the city prior to World War II with Manikonda Chalapathi Rau as its editor.

One of the earliest All India Radio stations has been operational in Lucknow since 1938.

FM radio transmission started in Lucknow in 2000. The city has the following FM radio stations: 
 Radio City 91.1 MHz
 Red FM 93.5 MHz
 Radio Mirchi 98.3 MHz
 AIR FM Rainbow 100.7 MHz
 Fever 104 FM 104.0 MHz
 Gyan Vani 105.6 MHz (educational)
 AIR FM Vividh Bharti 101.6 MHz
 CMS FM 90.4 MHz (educational)
 Mirchi Love 107.2 FM
 BBDU FM 90.8 MHz (of Babu Banarsi Das University)

"My Lucknow My Pride" is a mobile app launched by the district administration of Lucknow circa December 2015 in efforts to preserve "the cultural heritage of Lucknow" and to encourage tourism.

Sports

Cricket, association football, badminton, golf, and hockey are among the most popular sports in the city.

The main sports hub is the K. D. Singh Babu Stadium, which also has a swimming pool and indoor games complex. There are plans to develop KDSB stadium along the lines of Ekana Stadium. KDSB stadium needs Rs 2 billion in funds to redesign and upgrade as per international standards. The other stadiums are Dhyan Chand Astroturf Stadium, Mohammed Shahid Synthetic Hockey Stadium, Dr. Akhilesh Das Gupta Stadium at Northern India Engineering College, Babu Banarsi Das UP Badminton Academy, Charbagh, Mahanagar, Chowk and the Sports College near the Integral University.

In September 2017, Ekana International Cricket Stadium was opened to the public as it hosted 2017–18 Duleep Trophy. On 6 November 2018 Ekana International Cricket Stadium hosted its first T20 international match between Indian national cricket team and West Indies cricket team.

It is the Third largest cricket stadium in India by capacity after Kolkata's Eden Gardens and Ahmedabad's Narendra Modi Stadium. For decades Lucknow hosted the Sheesh Mahal Cricket Tournament.

Lucknow is the headquarters for the Badminton Association of India. Located in Gomti Nagar, it was formed in 1934 and has been holding national-level tournaments in India since 1936. 
Syed Modi Grand Prix is an international Badminton competition held here. Junior-level Badminton players receive their training in Lucknow after which they are sent to Bangalore.

The Lucknow Golf Club is on the sprawling greens of La Martinière College.

The city has produced several national and world-class sporting personalities. Lucknow sports hostel has produced international-level cricketers Mohammad Kaif, Piyush Chawla, Suresh Raina, Gyanendra Pandey, Praveen Kumar and R. P. Singh. Other notable sports personalities include hockey Olympians K. D. Singh, Jaman Lal Sharma, Mohammed Shahid and Ghaus Mohammad, the tennis player who became the first Indian to reach the quarter finals at Wimbledon.

In October 2021, an IPL franchise based in Lucknow was officially formed and was later named Lucknow Super Giants. It will play its home matches at BRSABV Ekana Cricket Stadium.

City-based clubs

Parks and recreation

 
The city has parks and recreation areas managed by the Lucknow Development Authority. These include Kukrail Reserve Forest, Qaisar Bagh, Gomti Riverfront Park, Dr. Ram Manohar Lohia Park, Eco Park, Ambedkar Memorial Park, Janeshwar Mishra park, the largest park in Asia, Buddha Park, Hathi Park. It boasts lush greenery, a man-made lake, India's longest cycling and jogging track and a variety of flora. The plan is also to set up a giant Ferris wheel inside the park on the lines of London Eye, providing a panoramic view of the city. Kukrail Picnic Spot (crocodile-breeding sanctuary), located near Lucknow Indiranagar Area. This is Asia's largest crocodile-breeding center. This along with a small zoo and ample open space make it unique.

Sister cities

Notable individuals

Historical places

 Bara Imambara
 Chhota Imambara
 Imambara Ghufran Ma'ab
 Aminabad
 Colvin Taluqdars' College
 La Martiniere Lucknow
 Isabella Thoburn College
 Qaisar Bagh
 Rumi Darwaza
 Shah Najaf Imambara
 Dargah of Hazrat Abbas
 Dilkusha Kothi
 Karbala of Dayanat-ud-Daulah
 Tomb of Mir Babar Ali Anis
 Imambara Sibtainabad (Maqbara of Amjad Ali Shah)
 Rauza Kazmain
 Residency
 Usman Enclave
 All Saints Garrison Church, Lucknow
 Alambagh
 Begum Hazrat Mahal Park

See also
 Amir-ud-daula Public Library
 Bharwara Sewage Treatment Plant
 Fun Republic Mall
 List of cities in India by population
 List of million-plus urban agglomerations in India
 List of tallest buildings in Lucknow
 List of twin towns and sister cities in India
 National Bureau of Fish Genetic Resources

References

Further reading

External links

 
 Official Site of Lucknow
 The India of the Nawabs, The New York Times, Published: 25 February 1990

 
Metropolitan cities in India
Cities and towns in Lucknow district

Indian capital cities
Cities in Uttar Pradesh